Hans Ziegler was born in Winterthur, Switzerland, on 5 September 1910, and died in Estes Park, Colorado, on 5 August 1985. He was raised and spent his early career in Switzerland but much of his later career in the United States.

Hans Ziegler was a respected academic and was the author of a number of well respected textbooks on engineering and thermodynamics, which were translated into other languages, and re-issued in new editions.

In non-equilibrium thermodynamics, he considered a 'principle of maximum dissipation rate'. He was also an early proponent of a 'principle of maximum rate of entropy production', which is closely related to a 'principle of maximum dissipation rate'. The range of applicability and validity or invalidity of these 'principles' has been examined and debated by many others, and their eventual scientific status is yet to be settled.

References

1910 births
1985 deaths
Swiss expatriates in the United States
Swiss physicists
Swiss science writers